Idaho Legislative District 7 is one of 35 districts of the Idaho Legislature. It is currently represented by Carl Crabtree, Republican  of Grangeville, Priscilla Giddings, Republican of  White Bird, and Paul Shepherd, Republican of Riggins.

District profile (1992–2002) 
From 1992 to 2002, District 7 consisted of Clearwater and Lewis Counties and a portion of  Benewah, Idaho, Latah, and Nez Perce Counties.

District profile (2002–2012) 
From 2002 to 2012, District 7 consisted of Nez Perce County.

District profile (2012–2022) 
District 7 currently consists of Clearwater, Idaho, and Shoshone Counties and a portion of  Bonner County.

District profile (2022–) 
In December 2022, District 7 will consist of Idaho and Adams Counties and a portion of Nez Perce County.

See also

 List of Idaho Senators
 List of Idaho State Representatives

References

External links
Idaho Legislative District Map (with members)
Idaho Legislature (official site)

07
Clearwater County, Idaho
Idaho County, Idaho
Shoshone County, Idaho
Bonner County, Idaho